Aleksandre Jejelava ((born May 24, 1973) — was the Minister of Education and Science of Georgia from June 2016 to June 2018.

Early life and education  
Aleksandre Jejelava was born in Tbilisi. In 1995, he graduated from Tbilisi State University, with a degree in Applied Mathematics and Computer Sciences. In 2003-2005, he obtained a master's degree in General Management at ESM Business School – in Tbilisi. In 2009-2010, he studied at George Washington University, where he acquired a master's degree in Project Management. Since 2015, he is a certified international coach.

Career 
Since June 3, 2016, Aleksandre Jejelava holds a position as the Minister of Education and Science of Georgia. In 2010-2016, he held a position as a Chairman and a head coach at Management Academy. At the same time, he was a professor at the Bank of Georgia University and Caucasus School of Business. He was a professor at Tbilisi Free University, Caucasus University and a dean for the master's degree program at Georgian Institute of Public Affairs.

Aleksandre Jejelava also held a variety of positions at Open Society Georgia Foundation, the National Bank of Georgia, TBC Bank and the Intellect Bank. He was a speaker for the TEDx Tbilisi; and held a position as a Chairman of the board at V. Komarov Physics and Mathematics Public School N199. Furthermore, Aleksandre Jejelava was in charge of the IT strategic development at the Georgian Lottery Company.

Family 
He is married and has three daughters and one son.

References 

1973 births
Living people
George Washington University alumni
Government ministers of Georgia (country)
Politicians from Tbilisi